Los muchachos de antes no usaban gomina may refer to:

 The Boys Didn't Wear Hair Gel Before (Spanish: Los muchachos de antes no usaban gomina), a 1937 Argentine historical drama film
 Los muchachos de antes no usaban gomina (1969 film), a 1969 Argentine drama film